James Corwin Mackey (born February 25, 1986) is an American professional poker player. He attended the University of Missouri before dropping out of a pre-med program to pursue a career in professional poker. In 2007, at 21 years and 4 months, Mackey became the third youngest poker player at the time to ever win a World Series of Poker bracelet, when he won the $5,000 buy-in No-Limit Hold'em event, behind Steve Billirakis (won a bracelet in the first event of the 2007 tournament) and Jeff Madsen (won a bracelet in the 2006 tournament).

Early career
James Mackey started playing poker online in 2005 when he invested $75 in an online account.  He turned that initial investment into $20,000 and decided to pursue a career professionally.

World Series of Poker success
Mackey's near-record setting win (third youngest to win a bracelet), in the 2007 $5,000 buy-in No-Limit Hold'em event, came against a final table that included two players from the 2005 and 2006 Main Event, as well as two former bracelet winners. The final hand of the tournament was the famous 10-2 – the same hand that Doyle Brunson won back to back World Series of Poker Main Events with.

In the following year's tournament, Mackey finished runner-up in the $10,000 World Championship Mixed Event, earning $297,792.

World Championship of Online Poker 

On September 24, 2007, Mackey under the screen name mig.com won the PokerStars World Championship of Online Poker (WCOOP) $1050 buy-in event winning $580,212.50 and the WCOOP bracelet. This was the third biggest prize in the site's history.

As of 2020, James Mackey has live tournament winnings over $4,200,000. His 47 cashes at the WSOP account for $2,087,385 of those winnings.

World Poker Tour success
During Season 15 of the World Poker Tour (WPT), Mackey won the 2016 WPT Choctaw tournament, with a top prize of $666,758. Prior to this win, Mackey had finished at the final table of two WPT Seminole Hard Rock Showdowns, winning $124,704 for a seventh-place finish in Season 9 and $441,128 for a third-place finish in Season 12.

World Series of Poker bracelets

References

1986 births
American poker players
World Series of Poker bracelet winners
World Poker Tour winners
People from Kansas City, Missouri
People from Columbia, Missouri
People from Las Vegas
Living people